Robin Duke (born March 13, 1954) is a Canadian actress, comedian, and voice actress. Duke may be best known for her work on the television comedy series SCTV and, later, Saturday Night Live. She co-founded Women Fully Clothed, a sketch comedy troupe which toured Canada. She teaches writing as a faculty member at Humber College in Toronto and had a recurring role playing Wendy Kurtz in the sitcom Schitt's Creek.

Early life
Duke was born in Etobicoke, Ontario. She went to high school with Catherine O'Hara at Burnhamthorpe Collegiate Institute in Etobicoke; they first met in homeroom class.

Career 
In 1976, Duke joined O'Hara as part of the Toronto version of the stage comedy troupe The Second City, while also making several appearances in the troupe's television series, SCTV. Duke became a regular on SCTV from 1980 to 1981. She joined the cast of Saturday Night Live in 1981 when O'Hara suddenly dropped out of that show. She now teaches at Humber College's Comedy Writing and Performance program, teaching Improv and Voice and Acting, it's been quoted by her that "class C is my favorite"

Saturday Night Live (SNL) (1981–1984)
Duke was an actor and writer on SNL from 1981 to 1984. Duke was hired in place of Catherine O'Hara, who was chosen as a cast member in 1981 but had decided to return to SCTV instead. Duke's most popular character was probably Wendy Whiner, a woman who, with her equally whiny husband (Joe Piscopo), annoyed everyone she met. She is also remembered for appearing with Mr. T as the equally bizarre "Mrs. T" in a faux commercial for the real-life product "Mr. and Mrs. T's Bloody Mary Mix".

Film acting credits
Duke went on to appear in such films as Club Paradise (1986), Groundhog Day (1993), Stuart Saves His Family (1995) and Portrait of a Serial Monogamist (2015), along with many television guest appearances.

Voice-over acting credits
Duke is also the voice of Penny in the children's animated television series George and Martha. Her other voice roles include:
Bob and Margaret
Atomic Betty
Marvin the Tap-Dancing Horse

Women Fully Clothed (2004)
In 2004, Duke along with Kathryn Greenwood, Debra McGrath, Jayne Eastwood and Teresa Pavlinek created Women Fully Clothed, a sketch comedy troupe. The group has toured the United States, Canada and appeared in Scotland at the Edinburgh Festival.

Schitt's Creek (2016, 2019)
In 2016, Duke had a recurring role on Schitt's Creek playing dress shop owner Wendy Kurtz in five episodes of season 2. The sitcom reunited Duke with her former SCTV castmate Eugene Levy, and with Catherine O'Hara, whom she had replaced on SCTV. Duke made another appearance as Kurtz in the Season 5 episode “Roadkill”.

Filmography

Film

Television

References

External links
 
 
 Women Fully Clothed official website

1954 births
Actresses from Ontario
Canadian expatriate actresses in the United States
Canadian film actresses
Canadian television actresses
Canadian television personalities
Canadian voice actresses
Living people
Canadian women comedians
Canadian sketch comedians
People from St. Catharines
20th-century Canadian actresses
21st-century Canadian actresses
Canadian women television personalities
Comedians from Ontario
Canadian Comedy Award winners